The 1985 Volvo Tennis Los Angeles was a men's tennis tournament played on outdoor hard courts at the Los Angeles Tennis Center in Los Angeles, California in the United States that was part of the Super Series of the 1985 Volvo Grand Prix circuit. It was the 59th edition of the Pacific Southwest tournament and was held from September 16 through September 22, 1985. Eighth-seeded Paul Annacone won the singles title and the corresponding $50,000 first-prize money. Defending champion Jimmy Connors could not participate due to a suspension for receiving too many fines.

Finals

Singles
 Paul Annacone defeated  Stefan Edberg 7–6(7–5), 6–7(8–10), 7–6(7–4)
 It was Annacone's first singles title of his career.

Doubles
 Scott Davis /  Robert Van't Hof defeated  Paul Annacone /  Christo van Rensburg 6–3, 7–6

See also
 1985 Virginia Slims of Los Angeles – women's tournament

References

Los Angeles Open (tennis)
Volvo Tennis Los Angeles
Volvo Tennis Los Angeles
Volvo Tennis Los Angeles
Volvo Tennis Los Angeles